Justina Di Stasio (born November 22, 1992) is a Canadian wrestler of Italian and Cree descent.

Career
In 2015, Di Stasio won a gold medal in the 75 kg weight class at the annual Pan American Wrestling Championships. She also won the 2015 Dave Schultz Memorial. Later in 2015, on home soil, Di Stasio won silver at the 2015 Pan American Games in Toronto.

In 2018 at the World Wrestling Championships in Budapest, Di Stasio won gold in the 72 kg event. She spoke about pride in her Indigenous roots, thanking her Cree mother, from the Norway House Cree Nation in Manitoba, for working to give her opportunities leading to her success.

She won one of the bronze medals in her event at the 2022 Pan American Wrestling Championships held in Acapulco, Mexico. She won the gold medal in the women's 76 kg event at the 2022 Commonwealth Games held in Birmingham, England. She lost her bronze medal match in the 76 kg event at the 2022 World Wrestling Championships held in Belgrade, Serbia.

She won the silver medal in the women's 76kg event at the Grand Prix de France Henri Deglane 2023 held in Nice, France. She won one of the bronze medals in the women's 76kg event at the 2023 Grand Prix Zagreb Open held in Zagreb, Croatia.

References

External links
 

Canadian female sport wrestlers
Living people
1992 births
Sportspeople from Burnaby
Pan American Games silver medalists for Canada
Pan American Games medalists in wrestling
Wrestlers at the 2015 Pan American Games
Wrestlers at the 2019 Pan American Games
World Wrestling Championships medalists
First Nations sportspeople
Medalists at the 2015 Pan American Games
Medalists at the 2019 Pan American Games
Pan American Wrestling Championships medalists
Commonwealth Games medallists in wrestling
Commonwealth Games gold medallists for Canada
Wrestlers at the 2022 Commonwealth Games
21st-century Canadian women
First Nations sportswomen
Medallists at the 2022 Commonwealth Games